The Heath-Brown–Moroz constant C, named for Roger Heath-Brown and Boris Moroz, is defined as

where p runs over the primes.

Application
This constant is part of an asymptotic estimate for the distribution of rational points of bounded height on the cubic surface X03=X1X2X3.  Let H be a positive real number and N(H) the number of solutions to the equation X03=X1X2X3 with all the Xi non-negative integers less than or equal to H and their greatest common divisor equal to 1.  Then

References

External links
 Wolfram Mathworld's article

Mathematical constants
Infinite products